Rick Jacobson is an American film director, television director and producer, and stage and television actor.

Biography

A graduate from the California Institute of the Arts film and television program,  Rick Jacobson began his professional filmmaking career with legendary film producer Roger Corman when he hired Jacobson to direct the martial arts actioner “FULL CONTACT”, Jacobson's first full-length feature film, at the age of 21.  With 16 feature films as director, producer and writer to his credit, Jacobson shifted to the small screen where he continues work as director, producer and writer of over 100 episodes of episodic television including "SPARTACUS: Blood and Sand / Gods of the Arena / Vengeance / War of the Damned", "ASH vs EVIL DEAD", "KNIGHTFALL", Xena: Warrior Princess.

Jacobson's most recent work includes 2021's Don't Breathe 2" (Executive Producer) and Netflix's 2022 romantic comedy, The Royal Treatment (Director).

References

External links

Rick Jacobson Professional Website

American expatriates in New Zealand
American film directors
American television directors
Living people
Place of birth missing (living people)
Year of birth missing (living people)